The White Knights is a 2015 Belgian-French drama film directed by Joachim Lafosse and inspired by the events of the Zoé's Ark controversy in 2007. The film
stars Vincent Lindon, Louise Bourgoin, Valérie Donzelli and Reda Kateb. It was selected to screen in the Platform section of the 2015 Toronto International Film Festival. It was screened in the San Sebastián International Film Festival where Joachim Lafosse won the Silver Shell for Best Director.

Cast 
 Vincent Lindon as Jacques Arnault
 Louise Bourgoin as Laura Turine
 Valérie Donzelli as Françoise Dubois
 Reda Kateb as Xavier Libert 
 Stéphane Bissot as Marie Latour 
 Raphaëlle Lubansu as Nathalie Joris
 Jean-Henri Compère as Roland Duchâteau
 Philippe Rebbot as Luc Debroux
 Yannick Renier as Chris Laurent
 Tatiana Rojo as Christine Momboza 
 Catherine Salée as Sophie Tinlot
 Luc Van Grunderbeeck as Yves Meynard
 Tibo Vandenborre as Peter Demineur
 Filip Peeters as Lieutenant Reykart
 Alain Eloy as Lieutenant Liénart

Production 
The screenplay was written by Joachim Lafosse, Bulle Decarpentries, Thomas van Zuylen and Zélia Abadie, with the participation of Thomas Bidegain. The film was produced by Belgium’s Versus Production and Les Films du Worso in France, with co-production support from France 3 Cinéma, RTBF, Belgacom and Prime Time. The film is also supported by the Centre du Cinéma et de l’Audiovisuel of the Federation Wallonia-Brussels and the Belgian Federal Government Tax Shelter. Filming began on 17 March 2014, in the region of Erfoud in Morocco, and lasted for eight weeks.

Accolades

References

External links 
 

2015 drama films
2015 films
2010s French-language films
French drama films
Belgian drama films
Films shot in Morocco
Drama films based on actual events
Films directed by Joachim Lafosse
Films with screenplays by Thomas Bidegain
Les Films du Worso films
French-language Belgian films
2010s French films